The Little Tobacco River is a  river in Gladwin County, Michigan, in the United States. It is a tributary of the Tittabawassee River, which flows to the Saginaw River.

See also
List of rivers of Michigan

References

Michigan  Streamflow Data from the USGS

Rivers of Michigan
Rivers of Gladwin County, Michigan
Tributaries of Lake Huron